Andrea Mazzarani (born 6 November 1989) is an Italian professional footballer playing as a midfielder for  club Pergolettese.

Club career
In June 2011 Modena decided to sign him but Udinese excised the counter-option.

On 24 July 2019, he returned to Catania on a 2-year contract.

On 28 January 2021, he moved to Livorno.

On 15 July 2021, he signed a two-year contract with Carrarese. On 31 January 2022, Mazzarani was loaned to Pergolettese. On 12 July 2022, Mazzarani's contract with Carrarese was terminated by mutual consent. On the same day, he returned to Pergolettese on a two-year contract.

International career
He represented Italy at the 2008 UEFA European Under-19 Football Championship, where they came second, and at the 2009 FIFA U-20 World Cup.

Career statistics

Club

References

External links
 
 

1989 births
Living people
Footballers from Rome
Italian footballers
Association football midfielders
Serie A players
Serie B players
Serie C players
Atletico Roma F.C. players
Udinese Calcio players
F.C. Crotone players
Modena F.C. players
Novara F.C. players
S.S.C. Napoli players
Virtus Entella players
Catania S.S.D. players
U.S. Salernitana 1919 players
U.S. Livorno 1915 players
Carrarese Calcio players
U.S. Pergolettese 1932 players
Italy youth international footballers
Mediterranean Games silver medalists for Italy
Mediterranean Games medalists in football
Competitors at the 2009 Mediterranean Games